Muhammad Rashid (born 1935) is a Pakistani athlete. He competed in the men's long jump and the men's triple jump at the 1956 Summer Olympics.

References

1935 births
Living people
Athletes (track and field) at the 1956 Summer Olympics
Pakistani male long jumpers
Pakistani male triple jumpers
Olympic athletes of Pakistan
Place of birth missing (living people)